English units are the units of measurement used in England up to 1826 (when they were replaced by Imperial units), which evolved as a combination of the Anglo-Saxon and Roman systems of units. Various standards have applied to English units at different times, in different places, and for different applications.

Use of the term "English units" can be ambiguous, as, in addition to the meaning used in this article, it is sometimes used to refer to the units of the descendent Imperial system as well to those of the descendant system of United States customary units.

The two main sets of English units were the Winchester Units, used from 1495 to 1587, as affirmed by King Henry VII, and the Exchequer Standards, in use from 1588 to 1825, as defined by Queen Elizabeth I.

In England (and the British Empire), English units were replaced by Imperial units in 1824 (effective 1 January 1826) by a Weights and Measures Act, which retained many though not all of the unit names and redefined (standardised) many of the definitions. In the US, being independent from the British Empire decades before the 1824 reforms, English units were standardized and adopted (as "US Customary Units") in 1832.

History
Very little is known of the measurement units of the British Isles prior to Roman colonisation in the 1st century AD. During the Roman period, Roman Britain relied on Ancient Roman units of measurement. During the Anglo-Saxon period, the North German foot of 13.2 inches (335 millimetres) was the nominal basis for other units of linear measurement. The foot was divided into 4 palms or 12 thumbs. A cubit was 2 feet, an elne 4 feet. The rod was 15 Anglo-Saxon feet, the furlong 10 rods. An acre was 4 × 40 rods, i.e. 160 square rods or 36,000 square Anglo-Saxon feet. However, Roman units continued to be used in the construction crafts, and reckoning by the Roman mile of 5,000 feet (or 8 stades) continued, in contrast to other Germanic countries which adopted the name "mile" for a longer native length closer to the league (which was 3 Roman miles). From the time of Offa King of Mercia (8th century) until 1526 the Saxon pound, also known as the moneyers' pound (and later known as the Tower pound) was the fundamental unit of weight (by Offa's law, one pound of silver, by weight, was subdivided into 240 silver pennies, hence (in money) 240 pence - twenty shillings - was known as one pound).

Prior to the enactment of a law known as the "Composition of Yards and Perches" some time between 1266 and 1303, the English system of measurement had been based on that of the Anglo-Saxons, who were descended from tribes of northern Germany. However, it retained the Anglo-Saxon rod of 15 x  feet (5.03 metres) and the acre of 4 × 40 rods. Thus, the rod went from 5 old yards to  new yards, or 15 old feet to  new feet. The furlong went from 600 old feet (200 old yards) to 660 new feet (220 new yards). The acre went from 36,000 old square feet to 43,560 new square feet. Scholars have speculated that the Compositio may have represented a compromise between the two earlier systems of units, the Anglo-Saxon and the Roman.

The Norman conquest of England introduced just one new unit: the bushel. William the Conqueror, in one of his first legislative acts, confirmed existing Anglo-Saxon measurement, a position which was consistent with Norman policy in dealing with occupied peoples. The Magna Carta of 1215 stipulates that there should be a standard measure of volume for wine, ale and corn (the London Quarter), and for weight, but does not define these units.

Later development of the English system was by defining the units in laws and by issuing measurement standards. Standards were renewed in 1496, 1588 and 1758. The last Imperial Standard Yard in bronze was made in 1845; it served as the standard in the United Kingdom until the yard was redefined by the international yard and pound agreement (as 0.9144 metres) in 1959 (statutory implementation was in the Weights and Measures Act of 1963). Over time, the English system had spread to other parts of the British Empire.

Timeline
Selected excerpts from the bibliography of Marks and Marking of Weights and Measures of the British Isles
1215 Magna Carta — the earliest statutory declaration for uniformity of weights and measures
1335: 8 & 9 Edw III c1 — First statutory reference describing goods as avoirdupois
1414 2 Hen V c4 — First statutory mention of the Troy pound
1495 12 Hen VII c5 — New Exchequer standards were constructed including Winchester capacity measures defined by Troy weight of their content of threshed wheat by stricken measure (first statutory mention of Troy weight as standard weight for bullion, bread, spices etc.).
1527 Hen VIII — Abolished the Tower pound
1531 23 Hen VIII c4 — Barrel to contain 36 gallons of beer or 32 of ale; kilderkin is half of this; firkin is half again
1532 24 Hen VIII c3 — First statutory references to use of avoirdupois weight
1536 28 Hen VIII c4 — Added the tierce (41 gallons)
1588 (Elizabeth I) — A new series of Avoirdupois standard bronze weights (bell-shaped from 56 lb to 2 lb and flat-pile from 8 lb to a dram), with new Troy standard weights in nested cups, from 256 oz to 1/8 oz in a binary progression.
1601–1602 — Standard bushels and gallons were constructed based on the standards of Henry VII and a new series of capacity measures were issued.
1660 12 Chas II c24 — Barrel of beer to be 36 gallons, taken by the gauge of the Exchequer standard of the ale quart; barrel of ale to be 32 gallons; all other liquors retailed to be sold by the wine gallon;
1689 1 Wm & Mary c24 — Barrels of beer and ale outside London to contain 34 gallons
1695 7 Will III c24 — Irish Act about grain measures decreed: unit of measure to be Henry VIII's gallon as confirmed by Elizabeth I; i.e. 272 1/4 cubic inches; standard measures of the barrel (32 gallons), half-barrel (16 gallons), bushel (8), peck (2), and gallon lodged in the Irish Exchequer; and copies were provided in every county, city, town, etc.
1696 8 & 9 Will III c22 — Size of Winchester bushel "every round bushel with a plain and even bottom being ″ wide throughout and 8″ deep" (i.e. a dry measure of 268.8 in3 per gallon).
1706 5 & 6 Anne c27 — Wine gallon to be a cylindrical vessel with an even bottom 7″ diameter throughout and 6″ deep from top to bottom of the inside, or holding 231 in3 and no more.
1706 6 Anne c11 — Act of Union decreed the weights and measures of England to be applied in Scotland, whose burgs (towns) were to take charge of the duplicates of the English Standards sent to them.
1713 12 Anne c17 — The legal coal bushel to be round with a plain and even bottom, 19 1/2 inch from outside to outside and to hold 1 Winchester bushel and 1 quart of water.
1718 5 Geo I c18 — Decreed Scots Pint to be exactly 103 in3.
1803 43 Geo III c151 — Referred to wine bottles making about 5 to the wine gallon (i.e. Reputed Quarts)
1824 5 Geo IV c74 — Weights and Measures Act completely reorganized British metrology and established Imperial weights and measures; defined the yard, troy and avoirdupois pounds and the gallon (as the standard measure for liquids and dry goods not measured by heaped measure), and provided for a 'brass' standard gallon to be constructed.
1825 6 Geo IV c12 — Delayed introduction of Imperial weights and measures from 1 May 1825 to 1 January 1826.
1853 16 & 17 Vict c29 — Permitted the use of decimal Bullion weights.
1866 29 & 30 Vict c82 — Standards of Weights, Measures and Coinage Act transferred all duties and standards from the Exchequer to the newly created Standards Department of the Board of Trade.
1878 41 & 42 Vict c49 — Weights and Measures Act defined the Imperial standard yard and pound; enumerated the secondary standards of measure and weight derived from the Imperial standards; required all trade by weight or measure to be in terms of one of the Imperial weights or measures or some multiple part thereof; abolished the Troy pound.
1963 11 & 12 Eliz II c31 — Weights and Measures Act abolished the chaldron of coal, the fluid drachm and minim (effective 1 February 1971), discontinued the use of the quarter, abolished the use of the bushel and peck, and abolished the pennyweight (from 31 January 1969).

Length

Area

Administrative units 
 Hide four to eight bovates. A unit of yield, rather than area, it measured the amount of land able to support a single household for agricultural and taxation purposes.
 Knight's fee five hides.  A knight's fee was expected to produce one fully equipped soldier for a knight's retinue in times of war.
 Hundred or wapentake 100 hides grouped for administrative purposes.

Volume 

Many measures of capacity were understood as fractions or multiples of a gallon. For example, a quart is a quarter of a gallon, and a pint is half of a quart, or an eighth of a gallon. These ratios applied regardless of the specific size of the gallon. Not only did the definition of the gallon change over time, but there were several different kinds of gallon, which existed at the same time. For example, a wine gallon with a volume of 231 cubic inches (the basis of the U.S. gallon), and an ale gallon of 282 cubic inches, were commonly used for many decades prior to the establishment of the imperial gallon. In other words, a pint of ale and a pint of wine were not the same size. On the other hand, some measures such as the fluid ounce were not defined as a fraction of a gallon. For that reason, it is not always possible to give accurate definitions of units such as pints or quarts, in terms of ounces, prior to the establishment of the imperial gallon.

General liquid measures

Liquid measures as binary submultiples of their respective gallons (ale or wine):

Wine

Wine is traditionally measured based on the wine gallon and its related units. Other liquids such as brandy, spirits, mead, cider, vinegar, oil, honey, and so on, were also measured and sold in these units.

The wine gallon was re-established by Queen Anne in 1707 after a 1688 survey found the Exchequer no longer possessed the necessary standard but had instead been depending on a copy held by the Guildhall. Defined as 231 cubic inches, it differs from the later imperial gallon, but is equal to the United States customary gallon.
Rundlet 18 wine gallons or  wine pipe
Wine barrel 31.5 wine gallons or  wine hogshead
Tierce 42 wine gallons,  puncheon or  wine pipe
Wine hogshead 2 wine barrels,  63 wine gallons or  wine tun
Puncheon or tertian 2 tierce, 84 wine gallons or  wine tun
Wine pipe or butt 2 wine hogshead, 3 tierce, 7 roundlet or 126 wine gallons
Wine tun 2 wine pipe, 3 puncheon or 252 wine gallons

Ale and beer

Pin 4.5 gallons or  beer barrel
Firkin 2 pins, 9 gallons (ale, beer or goods) or  beer barrel
Kilderkin 2 firkins, 18 gallons or  beer barrel
Beer barrel 2 kilderkins, 36 gallons or  beer hogshead
Beer hogshead 3 kilderkins, 54 gallons or 1.5 beer barrels
Beer pipe or butt 2 beer hogsheads, 3 beer barrels or 108 gallons
Beer tun 2 beer pipes or 216 gallons

Grain and dry goods

The Winchester measure, also known as the corn measure, centered on the bushel of approximately 2,150.42 cubic inches, which had been in use with only minor modifications since at least the late 15th century. The word corn at that time referred to all types of grain. The corn measure was used to measure and sell many types of dry goods, such as grain, salt, ore, and oysters.

However, in practice, such goods were often sold by weight. For example, it might be agreed by local custom that a bushel of wheat should weigh 60 pounds, or a bushel of oats should weigh 33 pounds. The goods would be measured out by volume, and then weighed, and the buyer would pay more or less depending on the actual weight. This practice of specifying bushels in weight for each commodity continues today. This was not always the case though, and even the same market that sold wheat and oats by weight might sell barley simply by volume. In fact, the entire system was not well standardized. A sixteenth of a bushel might be called a pottle, hoop, beatment, or quartern, in towns only a short distance apart. In some places potatoes might be sold by the firkin—usually a liquid measure—with one town defining a firkin as 3 bushels, and the next town as 2 1/2 bushels.

The pint was the smallest unit in the corn measure. The corn gallon, one eighth of a bushel, was approximately 268.8 cubic inches. Most of the units associated with the corn measure were binary (sub)multiples of the bushel:

Other units included the wey (6 or sometimes 5 seams or quarters), and the last (10 seams or quarters).

Specific goods
Perch 24.75 cubic feet of dry stone, derived from the more commonly known perch, a unit of length equal to 16.5 feet.
Cord 128 cubic feet of firewood, a stack of firewood 4 ft × 4 ft × 8 ft

Chemistry
Fluid-grain The volume of 1 grain of distilled water at 62 °F, 30 inHg pressure.

At that reference, water has a density of ≃ 0.9988 (438.0 or 1.001), and thus:
= 1.096 imperial minim = .06488 ml or approximately a drop.

Weight 

The Avoirdupois, Troy and Apothecary systems of weights all shared the same finest unit, the grain; however, they differ as to the number of grains there are in a dram, ounce and pound.  This grain was legally defined as the weight of a grain seed from the middle of an ear of barley. There also was a smaller wheat grain, said to be  (barley) grains or about 48.6 milligrams.

The avoirdupois pound contained 7,000 grains and was used for all products not subject to Apothecaries's or Tower weight.

Avoirdupois

Troy and Tower 
The Troy and Tower pounds and their subdivisions were used for coins and precious metals. The Tower pound, which was based upon an earlier Anglo-Saxon pound, was replaced by the Troy pound when a proclamation dated 1526 required the Troy pound to be used for mint purposes instead of the Tower pound. No standards of the Tower pound are known to have survived.

Established in the 8th century by Offa of Mercia, a pound sterling (or "pound of sterlings") was that weight of sterling silver sufficient to make 240 silver pennies.

Troy 

 Grain (gr)  = 64.79891 mg
 Pennyweight (dwt)  24 gr ≈ 1.56 g
 Ounce (oz t)  20 dwt = 480 gr ≈ 31.1 g
 Pound (lb t)  12 oz t = 5760 gr ≈ 373 g
 Mark 8 oz t

Tower 
 Grain (gr)  =  gr t ≈ 45.6 mg
 Pennyweight (dwt)  32 gr T =  gr t ≈ 1.46 g
 Tower ounce  20 dwt T = 640 gr T =  dwt t = 450 gr t ≈ 29.2 g
 Tower pound  12 oz T = 240 dwt T = 7680 gr T = 225 dwt t = 5400 gr t ≈ 350 g
 Mark 8 oz T ≈ 233 g

Apothecary 

 Grain (gr)  = 64.79891 mg
 Scruple (s ap)  20 gr
 Dram (dr ap)  3 s ap = 60 gr
 Ounce (oz ap)  8 dr ap = 480 gr
 Pound (lb ap)  5760 gr = 1 lb t

Others 

 Merchants/Mercantile pound  15 oz tower = 6750 gr  ≈ 437.4 g
 London/Mercantile pound  15 oz troy = 16 oz tower = 7200 gr ≈ 466.6 g
 Mercantile stone  12 lb L ≈ 5.6 kg 

 Butcher's stone  8 lb ≈ 3.63 kg
 Sack  26 st = 364 lb ≈ 165 kg
 The carat was once specified as four grains in the English-speaking world.
 Some local units in the English dominion were (re-)defined in simple terms of English units, such as the Indian tola of 180 grains.
Tod 
 This was an English weight for wool. It has the alternative spelling forms of tode, todd, todde, toad, and tood. It was usually 28 pounds, or two stone. The tod, however, was not a national standard and could vary by English shire, ranging from 28 to 32 pounds.

See also 

 
 
 
 
 
 
 
 , a unit of 100 or 120 items

Notes

References

External links 
 English Customary Weights and Measures 
 Jacques J. Proot's Anglo-Saxon weights & measures page. Internet Archive Wayback Machine
 Alexander Justice, "A General Discourse of the Weights and Measures" (London, 1707).

Imperial units
Customary units of measurement
Economic history of England
Units of measurement by country